Majid Behbudali oghlu Behbudov (18 April 1873 — 6 September 1945) is an Azerbaijani khananda.

Biography
Majid Behbudov was born on April 18, 1873 in Shusha. According to Jalil bey Bagdadbeyov, he started singing in 1904. He had previously sung with tar player Tatevos and kamancha player Makich in the Karabakh and Ganja assemblies, and later in the villages and towns of the Caucasus. Majid Behbudov sang for many years with tar players Mashadi Zeynal, Rzabala and kamancha player Ruben Garakhanov at the Dvoryansky Club in Tbilisi. In 1910, the "Gramophone" Company invited the khananda to Riga to record his voice. He was considered a skilful performer of Mirza Husein sigah, Shushtar and Chahargah mughams and many folk songs. M.Behbudov also performed in musical performances, had concerts in Tabriz, Istanbul and Sofia. 

Majid Behbudov also contributed to the development of opera theater in Azerbaijan. He played the role of Khosrov in Sasha Oganezashvili's opera "Farhad and Shirin" in 1911. Majid Behbudov also performed in Uzeyir Hajibeyov's operas and operettas, and in Mashadi Jamil Amirov's opera "Seyfal-Mulk".

The khananda died on September 6, 1945 in Qazax.

Family
Husband of Firuza Vakilova.
Father of Rashid Behbudov, Anvar Behbudov and Najiba Behbudova.

References

1873 births
1945 deaths
19th-century Azerbaijani male singers
20th-century Azerbaijani male singers